Kui (କୁଇ)(also Kandh, Khondi, Khond, Khondo, Kanda, Kodu (Kōdu), Kodulu, Kuinga (Kūinga), Kuy) is a  South-Eastern Dravidian language spoken by the Kandhas. It is mostly spoken in Odisha, and written in the Odia script. With 941,988 registered native speakers, it figures at rank 29 in the 1991 Indian census. The Kui language was also referred to as the Kuinga language during the historical period. It is closely related to the Gondi and Kuvi languages.

Phonology

Vowels
Kui language has five short vowels and five long vowels. The vowels are illustrated below with romanization and IPA alphabet.

References

External links
Kui basic lexicon at the Global Lexicostatistical Database

Agglutinative languages
Dravidian languages
Endangered languages of India